Joseph Walker House, also known as Wayne's Quarters, is a historic home located in Tredyffrin Township, Chester County, Pennsylvania. The house was built in four sections, with the oldest dated to about 1757. It is the three bay at the western end of the eleven bay house, and is a two-story, double pile stone structure.  The additions took place about 1820, about 1870, and about 1920.  It was renovated in 1950 and Colonial Revival details added. During the American Revolution the house served as headquarters for General Anthony Wayne in late-1777 and early-1778, during the encampment at Valley Forge.

It was listed on the National Register of Historic Places in 1986.

References

Valley Forge
Houses on the National Register of Historic Places in Pennsylvania
Georgian architecture in Pennsylvania
Colonial Revival architecture in Pennsylvania
Houses completed in 1920
Houses in Chester County, Pennsylvania
National Register of Historic Places in Chester County, Pennsylvania